Tally Mountain  is a name used to describe two different mountain peaks located in two different Georgia counties.

Haralson County
 Tally Mountain, elevation , is a summit located southeast of Tallapoosa. The mountain's native Creek Indian name was "Chun-ne-mic-co".

Pickens County

 Tally Mountain, elevation , is a summit located west of Jasper near Sharp Mountain.

References

Mountains of Haralson County, Georgia
Landforms of Pickens County, Georgia
Mountains of Georgia (U.S. state)